Events from the year 1414 in Ireland.

Incumbent
Lord: Henry V

Events
 A prolonged struggle begins between the factions of James Butler, 4th Earl of Ormonde, and John Talbot, 2nd Earl of Shrewsbury, for control of royal government in Ireland (lasted until 1447).

Births

Deaths

References

 
1410s in Ireland
Ireland
Years of the 15th century in Ireland